The 1912 Tasmanian state election was held on Tuesday, 30 April 1912 in the Australian state of Tasmania to elect 30 members of the Tasmanian House of Assembly. The election used the Hare-Clark proportional representation system — six members were elected from each of five electorates.

Elliott Lewis was elected as an Anti-Socialist at the 1909 election, and was Premier of Tasmania from 27 October 1909. He was urged by his predecessor, John Evans (premier from 11 July 1904 to 19 June 1909), to organise anti-Labor forces against a resurgent Labor Party (which won 12 seats at the 1909 election) and to support the formation of the Tasmanian Liberal League (not directly related to the modern Liberal Party).

Lewis was the incumbent Premier at the 1912 election, and John Earle was Labor Party leader. The election saw an increase in Labor seats from 12 to 14, just short of a House of Assembly majority. The Liberal Party won the election, with a two-seat majority. Despite leading the Liberals to victory, Lewis was criticised within the party, and resigned the leadership to Albert Solomon on 14 June the same year.

Key dates

Results

|}

Distribution of seats

See also
 Members of the Tasmanian House of Assembly, 1912–1913
 Candidates of the 1912 Tasmanian state election

References

External links
Assembly Election Results, 1912, Parliament of Tasmania.
Report on General Election, 1912, Tasmanian Electoral Commission, 30 April 1912.

Elections in Tasmania
1912 elections in Australia
1910s in Tasmania
April 1912 events